Events from the year 1733 in France.

Incumbents 
Monarch: Louis XV

Events

Births
 

 May 4 – Jean-Charles de Borda, French mathematician, physicist, political scientist, and sailor (d. 1799)

Deaths
 

 March 4 – Claude de Forbin, French naval commander (b. 1656)
 September 12 – François Couperin, French composer (b. 1668)

See also

References

1730s in France